Lake Emerald may refer to:

Emerald Lake (disambiguation)
Somatochlora cingulata, the Lake Emerald, a North American dragonfly